One Thousand Museum is a high-rise residential condominium in Miami, Florida, United States. The building, which is located at 1000 Biscayne Boulevard, across from Museum Park, was designed by Pritzker Prize-winning architect Zaha Hadid. After the death of Hadid, the Project Director of Zaha Hadid Architects, Chris Lepine, completed the project.

The depths of two auger-cast piles broke a record for Miami-Dade County that had recently been set by HJ Foundation at the Porsche Design Tower in Sunny Isles Beach.  

The exotic design of the building features a curving exoskeleton partially obscuring the balconies that also serves structural purposes, allowing the interior space to have fewer columns. To meet the architect's designs of smoothness and finish, the columns were finished with glass fiber reinforced concrete permanent form works. The effect of the design and height on wind loading is part of the reason the foundation had to be exceptionally deep. The building is considered ultra-luxury, containing about 84 large units priced at about double the cost per square foot of nearby condominium towers, with amenities possibly including a rooftop helipad.

In early 2018, before the building was finished, an episode of PBS' Impossible Builds featured the building, which they referred to as the "scorpion tower", and described it as "one of the most complex skyscrapers ever to make it off the drawing board."

Design 
Designed by Iraqi-British architect Zaha Hadid, One Thousand Museum was Zaha Hadid's first residential tower in the Western Hemisphere, and one of the final projects designed by Hadid in her lifetime. It was designed in association with O’Donnell Dannwolf Partners Architects, a local architecture firm. 

A notable feature of the building is the curving exoskeleton, allowing the interior space to have fewer columns. The exoskeleton is composed of 5,000 pieces of glass fiber reinforced concrete. These pieces were shipped from Dubai early in the construction process. The exoskeleton is located in front of a glass facade.

The building was topped out in February 2018.

Facilities 
The building contains 84 residences, consisting of a two-story duplex penthouse, 4 townhouses, 10 full-floor residences, and 70 half-floor units. 

A swimming pool is installed at the top of the building, covered by a curving, faceted metal ceiling that reflects the water. The double-height space is occupied by the pool on one side and a seating area on the other. A similar metallic canopy design is used for the bar. A full two-room treatment spa, hair and beauty salon, acai and juice bar fueled by Raw Republic, and a sunbathing area is also installed, alongside a multimedia tower.

Gallery

References

External links

 
 One Thousand Museum (PDF)

Zaha Hadid buildings
Residential skyscrapers in Miami
Residential condominiums in Miami
Residential buildings completed in 2019
2019 establishments in Florida